Lagabora River is a river of south-central Ethiopia.

See also
 List of rivers of Ethiopia

Rivers of Ethiopia